"Jesus" is the twenty-eighth single by Japanese musical artist Gackt. It was released on December 3, 2008.

Summary
"Jesus" marked the beginning of Gackt's move back into music scene after a year, and the story of ЯR Project began in 2001 with release of the album Rebirth and Requiem et Reminiscence tour. The sequel to the story was the Gackt Visualive Tour Requiem et Reminiscence II 2008-2009 tour, which he explained in detail on his website through "Asakura's Report".

"Jesus" is first Gackt's release from his own label Dears, but still supported by Nippon Crown. A limited edition version with a PV was released on November 26, 2008 for members of Gackt's official fanclub, Dears, and the regular edition was released on December 3, 2008.

In 2009, Gackt in a French magazine interview stated that Metallica's song "One" influenced him for writing the song "Jesus", whose certain part is a homage to "One".

The song "Jesus" was covered in English version by Gackt's band Yellow Fried Chickenz's and performed live including at Makuhari Messe in 2011, released on DVD recording World Tour *Show Ur Soul.I* 世壊傷結愛魂祭 at Makuhari 2011 in 2012.

Track listing

Charts

References

2008 singles
Gackt songs
Songs written by Gackt
Songs about Jesus
2008 songs